The Foreign Policy and United Nations Association of  Austria (UNA-Austria) was founded in 2008, when the "United Nations Association of Austria" and the "Austrian Association for Foreign Policy and International Relations" were merged. UNA-Austria is a founding member of the World Federation of United Nations Associations (WFUNA) and has as well an independent youth organization, the United Nations Youth and Students Association of Austria (UNYSA-Austria).

Aims 
The main aim of UNA-Austria is informing the Austrian civil society about Austrian foreign policy, international relations and the European Union. With that, UNA-Austria wants to strengthen the interest for actual international relevant topics in politics, economy and society. Another focus lies on information about the United Nations and its specialized organizations.

Activities 
UNA-Austria organizes weekly lectures at the "UNA-Austria Wednesday Club", where diplomats, politicians and scientists are invited from all over the world to the premises of UNA-Austria at the Spanish Riding School in Vienna. Other lectures are being organized very often at the Austrian Parliament such as the lecture of United Nations Secretary General Ban Ki-Moon. The biggest annual event are the "Foreign Policy Talks" which are being held since 1967 at Hernstein Castle in lower Austria.

External links 
 Foreign Policy and United Nations Association of Austria
 United Nations Youth and Students Association of Austria

Charities based in Austria
Austria
Austria and the United Nations